New Town (Rajarhat New Town) is a planned satellite city of Kolkata, India. It is a part of Kolkata Metropolitan Area and comes under North 24 Parganas district and South 24 Parganas district in the Indian state of West Bengal. It is covered by New Town Kolkata Development Authority (NKDA).

HIDCO plans developing infrastructure like - roads, drains, sewerage line, water supply lines, major embellishment works and executed constructions like - buildings, projects, parks, museum, subways, over-bridges in New Town. The area mainly consisted of huge acres of cultivable lands and water bodies, which was acquired and developed in a planned manner. The process of investing in residential and industrial facilities and infrastructural development of the area was mainly started under the leadership of the then Chief Minister of West Bengal, Jyoti Basu in the late 1990s. The master plan envisions a township which is at least three times bigger than the neighbouring planned Salt Lake City. An information technology and residential hub is developed at New Town. New Town was declared as a Solar City by the former UPA-governed central regime and later this city was declared as Smart Green City by NDA-governed central regime with the help of Government of West Bengal following a proposal submitted by Mamata Banerjee, (Chief Minister of West Bengal) but later withdrawn from the Smart Cities Mission after the AITC-governed Bengal government decided to withdraw all cities of West Bengal from the competition. It has rejected 1,000 crore to be given for development of the city as smart city. New Town was enabled with 10.5 km of Wi-Fi Zone along the Major Arterial Road (part of Biswa Bangla Sarani) from Haldiram, near Dumdum/Kolkata Airport to Salt Lake Sector V, which also make it India's first Wi-Fi road connectivity. The stretch has already been declared as a green corridor.

Prehistory

A group of researchers of Archeological and Environmental science department of University of Calcutta found some pottery artifacts from a mound at Kochpukur area near the East Kolkata Wetlands in Southern New Town. Researchers said that the artifacts are very similar to the excavation of Chandraketugarh, that dates back to centuries. However the Radiocarbon dating of the potteries not yet done. These excavation reveals that New Town isn't as ‘New’ as we think generally.

Geography
New Town is located in the districts North 24 Parganas district and South 24 Parganas. New Town has an area covered of 60.354 km2 and total of 93.9 km2 area under planning and development. Area of New Town includes Action Area I, II, III and a Central Business District. Action Area IV is also under planning.

It was declared as a part of the Kolkata Metropolitan Area in August 2016 by Governor of West Bengal.

Economy
New Town being three times the size of Salt Lake has emerged as the second IT hub of Kolkata. Several Information Technology majors are operational the likes of Ericsson, Accenture, Capgemini, Tech Mahindra, ITC Infotech, Mindtree, Bengal Silicon Valley, Adani Labs, British Telecom, etc. while others like TCS (40 acres), Wipro (45 acres) and Infosys (50 acres) have been allotted space along with Cognizant. Many luxurious hotels like Fairfield by Marriott, Novotel, Ibis, Taj Hotels, Westin Hotels & Resorts, The Park Hotels, Holiday Inn, Wyndham Hotels & Resorts, Lemon Tree Hotels, etc. have also come up in the area.

New Town is also being developed as a Fintech hub by HIDCO. So far 25 financial institutions, both banking and non-banking, have taken up space in the Fintech hub located in the New Town.

Demographics
As of April 2018, the residential population of New Town is estimated to be more than 1 million with 0.5 million additional floating population.

Civic administration

The New Town Kolkata Development Authority (NKDA) has been constituted under The New Town Kolkata Development Authority Act, 2007 (The West Bengal Act XXX of 2007) for rendering various civic services and amenities within New Town, Kolkata and it has come into effect since November, 2008. It is a transitional arrangement in the way of creation of an Urban Local Body (ULB). The administration is headed by a chairman, exercising authority over a member secretary and chief executive officer, who in turn oversee various specific committees, set up to implement various duties.

Utility services
As of 2015, New Town gets 200 litre per capita per day (lcpd)  of treated water every day with potable water that is sourced from the Hooghly River. Water treatment plants with computerised monitoring and control system are in place. 100% of the garbage is collected by sanitary workers through door to door collection. As of 2015, more than 70% of the solid waste management vehicles and street sweeping vehicles have been fitted with GPS devices for effective monitoring. All the garbage is compacted at compacting stations before disposing of it in dumping grounds.

Housing Infrastructure Development Corporation (HIDCO) plans and executes development projects in New Town, Kolkata. The erstwhile planning area of HIDCO is divided into four Action Areas i.e. Action Area - I, Action Area – II, Action Area - III and Action Area - IV (still not started). The Central Business District (CBD) is located between Action Area - I & II. As multinational IT companies are coming in New Town, HIDCO is developing the city as per their master plan. HIDCO has also decided to install the geographic information system (GIS) to integrate the database on the number of house owners, property tax, mutation, building construction etc. in New Town.

Electricity is supplied and managed by New Town Electric Supply Company Limited (NTESCL). Fire services are handled by the West Bengal Fire Service, a state agency. The Bidhannagar Police Commissionerate looks after the law and order in the city.

State-owned Bharat Sanchar Nigam Limited (BSNL), as well as private enterprises, among them Vodafone, Bharti Airtel, Idea Cellular, Reliance Jio, Tata DoCoMo are the leading telephone and cell phone service providers in the city. Kolkata being the first city in India to have cell phone and 4G connectivity, the GSM and CDMA cellular coverage is extensive in New Town.

Transport

The main mode of transportation, like other parts of Kolkata includes air conditioned, non-AC government and private buses, taxi and other popular Indian transports like auto rickshaw and e-rickshaws. As of 2015, around 300 buses on 25 different bus routes, either passes through or originates from New Town. As of November 2016, the New Garia–Dumdum/Kolkata Airport Line (Line 6) of the Kolkata Metro, which passes through New Town, is under-construction with cost inflation and delays.

Education

Some of the educational and training institutes that are setting up their campuses in New Town:
University of Engineering & Management (UEM), Kolkata
 Amity University Kolkata
 Presidency University
 St. Xaviers University
 IIT Kharagpur Research Park
 Aliah University
 Indian Institute of Social Welfare and Business Management
 Institute of Chartered Accountants of India
 Ramakrishna Mission Centre of Excellence
 Belle Vue Nursing College
 West Bengal Power Development Corporation (WBPDCL) Training Institute
 Techno India
West Bengal Judicial Academy

For the children, to study up to the 12th standard, New Town also houses many schools:
 Delhi Public School
 Narayana School
The Newtown School
 Bodhicariya Senior Secondary School
 Sri Chaitanya techno school

See also
 Satellite city
 Biswa Bangla Gate
 Eco Park

References

External links

 
 New Town, Kolkata – Development Authority West Bengal

 
Neighbourhoods in Kolkata
Planned communities
New towns started in the 1990s
Cities and towns in North 24 Parganas district
Planned cities in India
Neighbourhoods in North 24 Parganas district
Kolkata Metropolitan Area